The Pyynikki Circuit or Tampere Circuit is a former motorsport street circuit in Tampere, Finland. The roadraces were known as "Pyynikinajot" and were first run from 1932–1939. After an interruption caused by the Second World War they were revived in 1946, running until 1971. 

For the 1962 and 1963 seasons the Finnish Motorcycle Grand Prix, a round of the Grand Prix motorcycle racing world championship, was held on the Pyynikki Circuit. The circuit was found to be too narrow, and therefore the Finnish Grand Prix was moved to the Imatra Circuit from 1964.

Races on the Pyynikki Circuit were banned in 1971 for safety reasons, but in the final year the future World Champion Jarno Saarinen won two classes.

World Championship Results 1962 and 1963 

Grand Prix motorcycle circuits
Defunct motorsport venues in Finland
1932 establishments in Finland
1971 disestablishments in Finland
Pyynikki
Buildings and structures in Tampere